"No Other Baby" is a song written by Dickie Bishop and Bob Watson, originally recorded in 1957 by Dickie Bishop and The Sidekicks. Early cover versions were recorded by The Vipers (1958), Bobby Helms (1959), Paul & Paula (1964), Chad & Jeremy (1965; produced by George Martin), and Four Jacks and a Jill (1965).

Paul McCartney version

Paul McCartney recorded "No Other Baby" for his 1999 cover album Run Devil Run and released it as the only single from the album. The song reached number 42 on the UK singles chart.

The McCartney version was released as a 7" single and two CD singles, one of which was mixed in mono.

7" single (R 6527)
 "No Other Baby" (Dickie Bishop/Bob Watson) – 4:17
 "Brown Eyed Handsome Man" (Chuck Berry) – 2:27
 "Fabulous" – 2:15

CD Stereo single (CD R 6527)
 "No Other Baby" (Bishop/Watson) – 4:17
 "Brown Eyed Handsome Man" (Berry) – 2:27
 "Fabulous" (Bernie Lowe/Kal Mann) – 2:15

CD Mono single (CDRS 6527)
 "No Other Baby" (Bishop/Watson) – 4:17
 "Brown Eyed Handsome Man" (Berry) – 2:27
 "Fabulous" (Lowe/Mann) – 2:15

A music video by Paul McCartney performing "No Other Baby" was released by Gareth Francis.

References

1957 songs
1958 singles
1999 singles
Four Jacks and a Jill songs
Paul McCartney songs
Shakin' Stevens songs
Song recordings produced by Chris Thomas (record producer)
Song recordings produced by Paul McCartney
Parlophone singles